Thomas W. Hanshew (1857 – 1914) was an American actor and author, born in Brooklyn, N. Y.

Life and career 
Hanshew began a career as an actor when only 16 years old, playing minor parts with Ellen Terry's company.  Subsequently he played important roles with Clara Morris and Adelaide Neilson.  Later he was associated with a publishing house in London, where he resided at the end of his life.  He used, among others, the pen name "Charlotte May Kingsley," and wrote more than 150 novels, some of which were co-authored with his wife, Mary E. Hanshew.

Hanshew's best-known character was the consulting detective "Hamilton Cleek" (the assumed name of the King of Maurevania),, a reformed thief now working for law enforcement.  Cleek is known as "the man of the forty faces" for his incredible skill at disguise. The main character of dozens of short stories that began to be published during 1910 and were subsequently collected in a series of books, Cleek is based in Clarges Street, London, where he is consulted continually by Inspector Narkom of Scotland Yard.

Bibliography 
(this list is incomplete)
 Dark Corners of New York (1888)
 My Maid (1888) as "Charlotte May Kingsley"

Edison’s The Chronicles of Cleek series 
Ben F. Wilson appeared as Detective Hamilton Cleek in a series of silent film shorts:
 The Heritage of Hamilton Cleek (1914)
 The Mystery of the Sealed Art Gallery (1914)
 The Mystery of the Glass Tubes (1914)
 The Mystery of the Octagonal Room (1914)
 The Mystery of the Lost Stradivarius (1914)
 The Mystery of the Fadeless Tints (1914)
 The Mystery of the Amsterdam Diamonds (1914)
 The Mystery of the Silver Snare (1914)
 The Mystery of the Laughing Death (1914)
 The Mystery of the Ladder of Light (1914)
 The Mystery of the Talking Wire (1914)
 The Mystery of the Dover Express (1913)
 The Vanishing Cracksman (1913)

Reception

Even by the standards of the adventure fiction of the era, Hamilton Cleek is a notably unrealistic character, not only for his ability to impersonate anyone (including speaking multiple foreign languages perfectly) but for his physical derring-do and his frequent melodramatic encounters with Margot, "Queen of the Apaches", and her partner-in-crime Merode.

Further reading 
 
 
 
 
 Thomas W. Hanshew. The World's Finger: An Improbable Story London: Ward, Lock, 1901.

See also
 Charlotte Mary Brame (Bertha M. Clay)

References

External links
Thomas W. Hanshew
  under that name, and 1 as Charlotte May Kingsley, linked
 
 
Mary E. Hanshew
 
 
 
Thomas and Mary Hanshew
 

1857 births
1914 deaths
20th-century American novelists
American male stage actors
Writers from Brooklyn
American male novelists
20th-century American male writers
Novelists from New York (state)